Kakmakhi (Dargwa: Кьякьмахьи) is a rural locality (a selo) in Burgimakmakhinsky Selsoviet, Akushinsky  District, Republic of Dagestan, Russia. The population was 616 as of 2010.

Geography 
Kakmakhi is located 8 km northeast of Akusha (the district's administrative centre) by road. Burgimakmakhi is the nearest rural locality.

References 

Rural localities in Akushinsky District